De Broekmolen is a smock mill in Broeksterwâld, Friesland, Netherlands which has been restored to working order. The mill is listed as a Rijksmonument, number 11678.

History

De Broekmolen was built in 1876 by millwrights Wietse Jurjen en Comp. In 1911, Patent sails were fitted. This work was done by millwright Meindert van der Meulen of Dokkum. A new windshaft was fitted in 1915 at a cost of ƒ600. A new pair of sails were fitted in 1923 at a cost of ƒ565. The sails were fitted with Dekker streamlined leading edges in 1937 by millwright Westra of Franeker. A diesel engine was installed as auxiliary power in 1961 and the Archimedes' screw was renewed. The mill ceased working a few years later. The mill was restored in 1975. Common sails were fitted as part of the restoration. The mill was sold to Stichting De Fryske Mole (English: Frisian Mills Foundation) in 1977. New sails were fitted in 2008.

Description

De Broekmolen is a smock mill winded by a winch. There is no stage, the sails reaching almost to the ground. The mill has a single-storey brick base and a three-storey smock. The smock and cap are thatched. The windshaft also carries the brake wheel which has 44 cogs. This drives the wallower (23 cogs) at the top of the upright shaft. At the bottom of the upright shaft, the crown wheel (34 cogs) drives the steel Archimedes' screw via a gear wheel with 32 cogs. It is inclined at an angle of 23°. Each revolution of the screw lifts  of water.

Public access

De Broekmolen is open to the public by appointment.

References

External links

Windmills in Friesland
Windmills completed in 1876
Smock mills in the Netherlands
Rijksmonuments in Friesland
Dantumadiel
Octagonal buildings in the Netherlands